Archibald Atkinson (September 15, 1792 – January 7, 1872) was a slave owner and U.S. Representative from Virginia.

Biography
Born in Isle of Wight County, Virginia, Atkinson received a liberal education.  He attended the law department of the College of William & Mary (now the Marshall-Wythe School of Law), Williamsburg, Virginia.  He served during the War of 1812.  He was admitted to the bar and commenced practice in Smithfield, Virginia.  He was a member of the Virginia House of Delegates 1815–1817 and 1828–1831, and served in the Virginia Senate 1839–1843.

Atkinson was elected as a Democrat to the Twenty-eighth, Twenty-ninth, and Thirtieth Congresses (March 4, 1843 – March 3, 1849).  He was not a candidate for renomination in 1848 to the Thirty-first Congress.  In a valedictory speech to Congress in 1849, he described slavery as a "positive moral good" for those enslaved, claimed that the "well-fed, well-clad, contented negro of Virginia asks not your sympathy for him," and falsely claimed that slaves would rise up against abolitionists.

He served as prosecuting attorney for Isle of Wight County.  He died in Smithfield, Virginia, on January 7, 1872.  He was interred in the graveyard of Old St. Luke's Church, four miles southeast of Smithfield.

Elections
1841; Atkinson lost his first election for the U.S. House of Representatives; he was defeated by Whig Francis Mallory, winning only 11.26% of the vote.
1843; Atkinson was first elected to the U.S. House of Representatives with 50.07% of the vote, defeating Whig James E. Langhorne.
1845; Atkinson was re-elected with 55.9% of the vote, defeating Whig R.H. Whitfield.
1847; Atkinson was re-elected with 50.82% of the vote, defeating Whig Samuel Watts.

References

Sources

1792 births
1872 deaths
Democratic Party members of the Virginia House of Delegates
Democratic Party Virginia state senators
William & Mary Law School alumni
County and city Commonwealth's Attorneys in Virginia
People from Isle of Wight County, Virginia
American military personnel of the War of 1812
Democratic Party members of the United States House of Representatives from Virginia
19th-century American politicians
19th-century American lawyers